Heimioporus is a genus of fungi in the family Boletaceae. The genus is widely distributed in tropical and subtropical regions, and contains about 15 species.

The genus name of Heimioporus is in honour of Roger Jean Heim (1900-1979), who was a French botanist (Mycology) and Director of the National Museum of Natural History, France in Paris.

The genus was circumscribed by Egon Horak in Sydowia vol.56 on page 237 in 2004.

Species

References

External links

 
Boletaceae
Boletales genera
Taxa named by Egon Horak